The 2011 African Handball Champions League was the 33rd edition, organized by the African Handball Confederation, under the auspices of the International Handball Federation, the handball sport governing body. The tournament was held from October 21–30, 2011 in Kaduna, Nigeria, contested by 13 teams and won by Al Zamalek Cairo of Egypt.

Draw

Preliminary round 

Times given below are in WAT UTC+1.

Group A

* Note:  Advance to quarter-finals Relegated to 9-13th place classification

Group B

* Note:  Advance to quarter-finals Relegated to 9-13th place classification

Group C

* Note:  Advance to quarter-finals Relegated to 9-13th place classification

Knockout stage
Championship bracket

5-8th bracket

9–13th classification

Final ranking

Awards

See also
 2014 African Handball Championship

References

External links
 Tournament at goalzz.com
 Official website

African Handball Champions League
African Handball Champions League
African Handball Champions League
2011 Africa Handball Champions League
International handball competitions hosted by Nigeria